Mad Love (original title: Fou d'amour) is a 2015 French drama film directed by Philippe Ramos and starring Melvil Poupaud, Dominique Blanc and Diane Rouxel. It is an adaptation of Ramos' 1996 short film Ici-bas, which was in turn inspired by the Affair of the Uruffe priest in the 1950s. It won the Grand Prix des Amériques at the Montreal World Film Festival.

Plot
Set in France in 1959, a man who is convicted of a double murder is guillotined and subsequently the detached head begins to recount the events leading to his death.

Cast 
 Melvil Poupaud as the Priest
 Dominique Blanc as Armance
 Diane Rouxel as Rose 
 Lise Lamétrie as Lisette
 Jean-François Stévenin as the Priest of Mantaille 
 J.P. 'Van Gogh' Bodet as Félix the postman
 Jacques Bonnaffé as the great vicar
 Virginie Petit as Mademoiselle Desboine
 Nathalie Tetrel as Jacqueline the milkmaid
 Vanina Delannoy as Solange the cousin
 Anaïs Lesoil as Odette

Production 
Filming took place during the summer of 2014 in the Ain department, including Champagne-en-Valromey as well as in Belmont-Luthézieu, Virieu-le-Petit, Ceyzérieu, Virignin, Oncieu, Condon, Chanaz.

References

External links 
 
 

2015 films
2015 drama films
2010s French-language films
French drama films
French black comedy films
Films directed by Philippe Ramos
French films based on actual events
Films produced by Paulo Branco
Features based on short films
Films shot in Ain
2010s French films